Chinmayee Jena versus State of Odisha   (2020) is case where the Orissa High Court upheld the right of self-determination of gender as an integral part of personal autonomy and self-expression. The Court upheld that the couple has the right to decide their sexual preferences including the right to stay as live-in partners as consenting adults. The court granted the couple police protection.

See also 

 LGBT rights in India
 Sultana Mirza v. State of Uttar Pradesh (2020)
 Navtej Singh Johar v. Union of India (2018)
 National Legal Services Authority v. Union of India (2014)

References 

High Courts of India cases
2021 in LGBT history
2021 in India
Indian LGBT rights case law
LGBT rights in India
Transgender case law